Brian Taylor (19 June 1932 – 12 June 2017) was an English cricketer who played for and captained Essex County Cricket Club.

Known as "Tonker" Taylor for his forthright approach to batting and his evident enjoyment of the game, Taylor was a high-class wicketkeeper who was thought of in his early playing days as a potential successor to Godfrey Evans as England's keeper. He was named as Young Cricketer of the Year in 1956 by the Cricket Writers' Club, his first full season, though he had made his first-class debut seven years earlier. He toured South Africa with the Marylebone Cricket Club (MCC) side in 1956-57 as understudy to Evans, but did not feature in any of the Test matches as Evans had one of his most brilliant Test series.

In the event, his left-handed batting did not develop as much as had been hoped, and the Test call never came. But Taylor still had a long and distinguished career in county cricket. From 1961 to 1972, he played in 301 consecutive County Championship matches for Essex, and he captained the county from 1967 to 1973, when he retired. Under his captaincy, Essex assembled the nucleus of the young team that was to bring the county its first-ever trophies in the years after Taylor retired.

In all cricket, Taylor made 1,294 dismissals, which puts him seventh on the all-time list of wicketkeepers. He also made more than 19,000 runs in a total of 572 first-class matches. He was selected as a Wisden Cricketer of the Year in 1972. He was a Test selector for England from 1973. He took part in the first cricket tour of Bangladesh when MCC visited in 1976-77.

He also played football with Bexleyheath and Welling and Deal Town in the Kent League and Southern League.

He died in 2017.

References

External links

1932 births
2017 deaths
People from West Ham
English cricketers
Essex cricketers
Essex cricket captains
Commonwealth XI cricketers
International Cavaliers cricketers
Wisden Cricketers of the Year
England cricket team selectors
Players cricketers
Marylebone Cricket Club cricketers
Cricketers from Greater London
North v South cricketers
A. E. R. Gilligan's XI cricketers
T. N. Pearce's XI cricketers
20th-century British businesspeople
English footballers
Kent Football League (1894–1959) players
Bexley United F.C. players
Deal Town F.C. players